The Potash wars were a series of events that took place from 1910 to 1915 in the Searles Valley near Searles Lake, a dry lake (also called Slate Range Lake and Borax Lake), near the current town of Trona in the San Bernardino County of California. The Potash wars gained national and international news at the time due to the involvement of famous lawman Wyatt Earp and the importance of the valley's supply of potash at the time. Potash is an important crop fertilizer and the Searles Valley was a major supplier in the 1910s.

Background
In the mid-19th century and earlier, potash was produced almost exclusively on asheries from burning wood or kelp, but by 1861 Germans pioneered mining potassium salts and American farmers soon started using them as fertilizers on a wide scale.

In 1863, John W. Searles (1828-1897) discovered concentrated minerals in the saline deposits in Slate Range in the Mojave Desert southwest of Death Valley. John and his brother Dennis Searles discovered borax at Searles Lake while looking for gold with the Dr. S.G. George party.  Searles and Dennis filed claims for the minerals in 1873. Searles filed paperwork for a Federal land patent from the General Land Office in 1874 and began production and selling of minerals.  In 1878, Searles sold his interests and the patented land to the San Bernardino Borax Mining Company, which was founded by Francis Marion “Borax” Smith (1846-1931).  The Searles Valley operations closed in 1895 as Smith moved operations to Death Valley to work on the Pacific Coast Borax Company deposits. C.E. Dolbear founded the California Trona Company and filed 250 land claims for 160 acres around Searles Valley in 1908. To add to its mining right, the California Trona Company leased 2240 acres of patented lands for five years from the San Bernardino Borax Mining Company. To finance production, California Trona Company mortgaged some of the land to the Foreign Mines Development Company, a subsidiary of The Consolidated Gold Fields Company of South Africa, for two million dollars. In return, The Trona Company gave Foreign Mines Development Company 1000 shares of stock and a percentage of future gross sales. The California Trona Company built two experimental plants to recover soda ash, potash, borax and sodium sulfate from the dry lake. The plants were not successful and troubles developed between the California Trona Company and the Foreign Mines Development Company. Claims of incompetence, fraud, and conspiracy in both companies were made. The Foreign Mines Development Company began legal action to sell the property to recover mortgage debt on September 7, 1909. Stanford Wallace Austin was appointed receiver of the Trona Company.

By the beginning of the 20th century, Germany had a practically worldwide monopoly on potash in its Magdeburg - Halberstadt rock salt basin. In June 1909, Americans attempted to buy the mineral not from the national syndicate, but from independent producers at far lower prices. This led to the 1910 potash controversy between Germany and the United States over pricing, taxes, and tariffs. So, the Potash wars and production of potash at Searles Lake became a Federal issue with the Federal court and President Taft involvement. On March 26, 1912, President Taft sent a message to Congress about the Searles deposit at Borax Lake and his concern about Senator Reed Smoot bill; he requested an amendment as concern with a placer claim bill.

The war 

On June 17, 1910, eight men were spotted heading to Borax Lake to claim jump land of the California Trona Company. The men were unprepared for the remote harsh Desert. Next day Austin sent two employees around the lake, they found 6 of the men in poor health, with no water, the leader of the claim jump, Chas S. Davidson died on the lake. 
June 20, 1910 "On Saturday afternoon when the boys were brought to Borax I furnished them with food and had them all sign a quitclaim deed relinquishing to California Trona.

On October 19, 1910, 44 new Los Angeles claim jumpers arrived at Searles, their leader was  Henry E. Lee, an Oakland attorney. The group has surveyors, laborers and 20 men armed guards/gunmen. The leader of the guards/gunmen was Wyatt Earp. They camp at the abandoned town of Slate Range City.  To help stake their claim five of Earp's armed men, went to the nearby Austin claim in the morning. Earp told the group they were trespassers on the claim they owned. One of the men grabbed Earp's shotgun being held by one of his men. Earp pulled his automatic weapon and told him to let go and he did. As calm returned one man accidentally discharged his gun. On October 25, 1910, a US Marshall came and arrested Earp and 27 of his men and served them with a summons from Judge Charles W. Slack to appear before the U.S. Circuit Court for Contempt. Starting in 1901 Earp had gone to the desert from Los Angeles and made a number of mining claims.

The October 1910 event came up in a 1916 court case. Nick Cataldo claimed the Earp was working at the request of Tom Lewis, a Los Angeles Police Department Commissioner. He also claimed that Austin and three armed men came into Earp's camp and told the Lee party to depart.  Engineer  Lou Rasor told how Earp grabbed one of Austin's men's rifle and then had a revolver put to his face.

In December 1912 Lee put a second crew together to go back and try to reclaim his land claim. 
With unrest starting in Germany, who controlled the world market of potash, and with the importance of potash in the US, on December 23, 1912, a Federal Court instructed that Lee's claims be guarded by United States Officers, Deputy Sheriffs and the William J. Burns International Detective Agency. The action was taken due to the threat of Lee's armed men seeking to get back claims they said were taken from them in the rich potash and borax deposits of Searles lake. The news reminded many of the ’49 claim jumpers and mining camps fights. On December 27, 1912, Lee dropped his claim, there was a time limit on him re-staking this old claim and his time had run out, after he was not able to get his men to the old site and set up before the December 31 deadline.

Those that fought both with guns and in court were correct, the dry lake holds vast amounts of rich mineral wealth.

Post wars

In 1913 Consolidated Gold Fields of South Africa, British owned, founded the American Trona Corporation. American Trona Corporation acquired the California Trona Company due to the debt they held on the land. In  1914 The Trona Railway Company opened a 31-mile rail line from Trona to the Searles Station junction of the Southern Pacific Railroad. With the rail line, the products became successful. With the new boom, the American Trona Company Corporation founded the town of Trona, a company-owned town.

In 1917 American Trona Corporation built the American Trona Corporation Building in San Pedro, to process and store salt potash. The building was listed on the National Register of Historic Places in 1982.

From 1922 to 1928, the Epsom Salts Monorail crossed the Searles Lake on a wooden trestle.

In 1926 - American Trona became American Potash and Chemical Company. In 1967 American Potash & Chemical Corporation was sold to Kerr-McGee Corporation an Oklahoma oil and natural gas producer. On Dec. 3, 1990 the land and production was sold from Kerr-McGee to North American Chemical for 210-million. The sale included the plants, railroad and vast mineral reserves.
In 1998 IMC Global Incorporation purchased the plant. In 2004 Sun Capital purchased the plant and renamed it Searles Valley Minerals Incorporated. In 2008 Nirma purchased the plant Searles Valley Minerals Incorporated.

On August 16, 1962, John W. Searles discovery site was granted a California Historical Landmark designated.
The California Historical Landmark marker reads:

NO. 774 SEARLES LAKE BORAX DISCOVERY - John Searles discovered borax on the nearby surface of Searles Lake in 1862. With his brother Dennis, he formed the San Bernardino Borax Mining Company in 1873 and operated it until 1897. The chemicals in Searles Lake-borax, potash, soda ash, salt cake, and lithium-were deposited here by the runoff waters from melting ice-age glaciers, John Searles' discovery has proved to be the world's richest chemical storehouse, containing half the natural elements.

 A 2000 E Clampus Vitus monument was place to remember the Searles brothers:
The marker reads:
 This monument commemorates two wagon routes used by the Searles brothers to haul borax from their plant on Borax Lake (now Searles Lake) to the railhead at Mojave. The southern route traveled west of the Trona Pinnacles to Searles' freight station at Garden City. This is the present route of the Trona Railway which connects with the Union Pacific at Searles Station. Garden City was a virtual oasis, providing food and shelter for the teamsters and a barn accommodating 100 mules. The western route went through Salt Wells Canyon (Poison Canyon) to a dry station one mile from the head of the canyon and on to garden City where both routes joined. It then continued through Garlock and connected with the road to Mojave. Erected 2000 by Billy Holcomb Chapter No. 1069, E Clampus Vitus in cooperation with Searles Valley Historical Society.

Stafford Wallace Austin
Stafford Wallace Austin born on May 16, 1862, on Hilo, Hawaii. He graduated from the University of California, Berkeley. His first job was working for General Land Office in Lone Pine, California. He saw the actions of the Los Angeles Department of Water and Power in the Owens Valley and wrote a report to the Secretary of the Interior about the issue he saw. He departed the Land Office in 1906 and move to Oakland, California to practice private law. In addition to his practice he a teacher. He married Mary Hunter Austin on May 18, 1891, she wrote the book, Land of Little Rain about the Owens Valley. They had one child Ruth Austin (1891-1918). Austin and his brother came up with a new irrigation system and try to market it, but were unsuccessful. His private law firm became the receiver for foreclosure proceedings of the California Trona Company. His response was to find a way for the unsuccessful California Trona Company to move out of debt.  Much of the Potash wars can be found in his daily diary he kept form December 16, 1909 and November 30, 1917. He was paid $270 per month by the Foreign Mines Development Company. Austin had a test drill done and found that the mineral-rich layers ran about 100 feet under the dry lake. Austin later was the Trona city's first postmaster, appointed on March 27, 1914. Austin died on September 14, 1931, in Los Angeles, California. The Austins designed and built a home in Independence, California which later became a California Historical Landmark No. 229.

John Wemple Searles
John Wemple Searles was born on November 16, 1828, in Tribes Hill, New York.  His parents were George Searles (1802-1851) and Helen Wemple (1803-?). Both were from Montgomery County, New York. John was the oldest of five children. John Searles was one of the many 49ers that came to California in a wagon train looking for gold. His first claim was in 1852 at Indian creek in Shasta County, California with his brother Dennis. The Searles brothers mined and farmed, but in 1858 they lost their mine claims and farm in a debt lawsuit. To start fresh they traveled to Southern California after hearing about the gold and silver finds in the Slate Range. Near the Slate Range was a dry lake thought to be only salt and sodium carbonate. Searles heard that there many be useful borax at the lake, so they took some lake samples to San Francisco in 1863, but were told by a dishonest appraiser that there was no borax. But, Searles became suspicious after being followed on the way home. They had some good gold and silver finds in the Slate Range, but in the end, they again lost everything after another debt lawsuit in 1870.  John was seriously injured by a California grizzly bear in 1871, but survived. John Searles married Mary Ann Covington (1851 - 1923) in Los Angeles, California on January 1, 1873. They had one son they named after his brother, Dennis (1874-1916), born on February 27, 1874. They changed their focus from mining to the deposits at the Slate Range dry lake that now bears their name. The next test showed that the lake was rich in borax. The Searles brothers with other partners filed claims to 640 acres in 1873. They founded the new San Bernardino Borax Mining Company and built a plant to refine the borax and haul it out, just like the better know 20 Mule Team Borax team.  Claim jumpers came and tried the get in on the action, but the remote harsh desert drove them out. But, the high cost of refining and transporting borax, closed the company. In 1878 Searles sold his interests and the claim patents for the dry lake to the San Bernardino Borax Mining Company. Searles died on October 7, 1897, at the age of  68 at St. Helena, California. John and Mary are interred at Saint Helena Cemetery in Napa County, California.

See also
Panamint Valley
Indian Wells Valley
California water wars

References

External links
The Searles Valley Historical Society
Mineralogy Database - Minerals, Locations, Mineral Photos and Data
Discovery of Arsenic Eating Microbe
Searles Lake Gem and Mineral Society
Satellite Photo (Google Maps)

Searles Valley
Mojave Desert